Stratford-Kinlock was a provincial electoral district for the Legislative Assembly of Prince Edward Island, Canada. It was previously known as Glen Stewart-Bellevue Cove.

Members

Election results

Stratford-Kinlock, 2007–2019

2016 electoral reform plebiscite results

Glen Stewart-Bellevue Cove, 1996–2007

References

 Stratford-Kinlock information

Former provincial electoral districts of Prince Edward Island